Miss Universe Philippines is a beauty pageant and organization that selects the Philippines' official representative to the Miss Universe pageant. 

The reigning Miss Universe Philippines is Celeste Cortesi of Pasay who was crowned on April 30, 2022 at the Mall of Asia Arena in Bay City, Pasay City, Metro Manila, Philippines.

History
From 1964 up until 2019, Binibining Pilipinas held the national franchise for Miss Universe, wherein it was responsible for selecting the Filipino women who would represent the Philippines and compete at the annual Miss Universe pageant. Under Binibining Pilipinas, the Philippine representatives to the Miss Universe pageant were crowned under the title of Binibining Pilipinas from 1964 to 1971 and Binibining Pilipinas Universe from 1974 until 2011. In 2012, the franchise renamed the Binibining Pilipinas Universe title to Miss Universe Philippines. The title was first given to Janine Tugonon during the Binibining Pilipinas 2012 coronation night, and has been continuously given to the competition's annual winner since.

In December 2019, the Miss Universe franchise in the Philippines was officially granted to a new organizing body with Binibining Pilipinas Universe 2011 and Miss Universe 2011 3rd Runner-Up, Shamcey Supsup-Lee as its national director and Binibining Pilipinas Universe 2006, Lia Andrea Ramos as its Women Empowerment Chair, paving the way for the creation of the new Miss Universe Philippines Organization. Under the new organization, a separate, standalone pageant is now responsible for the selection of the future Miss Universe Philippines titleholders from 2020 onwards.

Crowns
 Filipina (2020–2021) —  Aptly named as Filipina, a feminine form of Filipino, the headwear was crafted by the Villarica family of Bulacan, a famous Filipino family of jewelers known for their famed Villarica Pawnshop Chain, along with an all-female staff. The elements of the crown are representations of qualities, aspirations, values, and symbols of the Filipino people. Swirl of leaves represents every women who aims for success in "different forms" but still keeps "the Filipino values in their hearts"; diamond embedded in each leaf signifies "the sparkle" in the lives of people that each woman encounters; golden South Sea pearls represent four values of creativity, intelligence, optimism, and fear of God; sapphire, ruby and topaz was patterned after  the blue, red, and yellow colors of the Philippine flag. The crown has an estimated value of ₱5 million. (Nearly $100,000).

 La Mer en Majesté (2022–present) — Aptly translated to "The Sea in Majesty", the crown pays homage to her majesty, the sea, for she is the queen of the elements.  Embedded in it are the Golden South Sea Pearls, the national gem of the Philippines, "a radiant symbol of the harmonious relationship between man and nature, capturing the very spirit of the Filipinos". The crown is crafted by Jewelmer, a French-Filipino fine jewellery brand based in the Philippines.

Gallery of Miss Universe crowns

Titles
Note that the year designates the time Miss Universe Philippines has acquired that particular pageant franchise.

Titleholders

Winners

International placements

Color Keys

Winners by regions

Gallery of winners

See also

 Binibining Pilipinas
 Miss World Philippines
 Miss Philippines Earth
 Philippines at major beauty pageants
 Big Four international beauty pageants
 List of beauty pageants

Notes

References

External links

Miss Universe Philippines
Philippines
Philippines
Recurring events established in 2020
2019 establishments in the Philippines
Philippine awards